Merirauma is a neighbourhood of Rauma, Finland. It is located in the northeast of the city and features several islands offshore including Kuuskari, Polla and Kaskinen .

References

Neighbourhoods of Rauma, Finland